Victor Dmitriyevich Smolski (born 1 February 1969) is a guitarist who was a member of the German heavy metal band Rage from 1999 until 2015, and a member of the metal bands Almanac, Mind Odyssey and Lingua Mortis Orchestra (LMO).

Biography 
The son of professor Dmitry Smolski, a symphonic music composer, Victor was six years old when he began studying the piano, cello and later guitar.

Smolski presented his a symphonic metal band called Almanac in 2015. Their debut album, Tsar, was released on 18 March 2016.

Discography

Rage 
 Ghosts (1999)
 Welcome to the Other Side (2001)
 Unity (2002)
 Soundchaser (2003)
 From the Cradle to the Stage (2004)
 Speak of the Dead (2006)
 Full Moon in St. Petersburg (2007)
 Carved in Stone (2008)
 Gib dich nie auf (Never Give Up) (2009)
 Strings to a Web (2010)
 21 (2012)
 LMO (2013)

Solo 
 Destiny (1996)
 The Heretic (2000)
 Majesty & Passion (2004)
 Guitar Force (2023)

Kipelov 
 Reki Vremeon (2005)
 Live in Moskau (DVD) (2005)

Mind Odyssey 
 Schizophenia (1995)
 Nailed to the Shade (1998)
 Signs (1999)
 Time to Change It (2009)

Nuclear Blast All-Stars 
 Into the Light (2007)

Almanac 
 Tsar (2016)
 Kingslayer (2017)
 Rush of Death (2020)

Others 

 Inspector – Russian Prayer (1993)
 Der Schuh des Manitu (Movie) – "Soundtrack" (2001)
 Siggi Braun Fine Young Guitars – "Perfect Passion" (2004)
 Traumschiff Surprise (Movie) – "Soundtrack" (2004)
 Vindex – Power Forge (2005)

Producer and guest musician for 

Lacrimosa, Mike Terrana, Der Bote, Vindex, Black Hole, Silent Force, Perzonal War, GB Arts, Seventh Avenue, Delirious, Avanitas, The Stokes, Point Whitmark, Adrian Weiss, Savn.

References

External links 

Belarusian composers
1969 births
Living people
Belarusian guitarists
Heavy metal guitarists
Rage (German band) members
Musicians from Minsk